The men's 50m backstroke events at the 2019 World Para Swimming Championships were held in the London Aquatics Centre at the Queen Elizabeth Olympic Park in London between 9–15 September.

Medalists

Results

S2

S3

S4

S5

References

2019 World Para Swimming Championships